Henry Nordin (8 December 1921 – 8 September 2018) was a Swedish fencer. He competed in the individual sabre event at the 1952 Summer Olympics.

Awards
   Swedish Fencing Federation Royal Medal of Merit in gold (Svenska fäktförbundets kungliga förtjänstmedalj i guld) (1996)

References

External links
 

1921 births
2018 deaths
Swedish male sabre fencers
Olympic fencers of Sweden
Fencers at the 1952 Summer Olympics
People from Eslöv Municipality
Sportspeople from Skåne County
20th-century Swedish people